The Two of Us (Swedish: Vi två) is a 1939 Swedish drama film directed by Schamyl Bauman and starring Sture Lagerwall, Signe Hasso and Stig Järrel. It was shot at the Centrumateljéerna Studios in Stockholm. The film's sets were designed by the art director Arthur Spjuth. It was followed by a sequel The Three of Us in 1940.

Synopsis
Architect Sture Ahrengren becomes entangled with the wife of his employer, despite having a supportive wife of his own.

Cast
 Sture Lagerwall as 	Sture Ahrengren
 Signe Hasso as 	Kristina - hans hustru
 Stig Järrel as 	Baltsar Ekberg
 Ilse-Nore Tromm as Helena - hans hustru
 Gösta Cederlund as 	Professor Hagstam
 Carl Barcklind as 	Doktor Frodde
 Torsten Hillberg as Konsul Odelgren
 Gunnar Björnstrand as Doctor 
 Gunnar Olsson as Bogren
 Lili Ziedner as 	Miss Edqvist, Hagstam's Secretary
 Stig Johanson as Construction Worker
 Karl Erik Flens as 	Construction Worker 
 Axel Högel as 	Father at the Maternity Ward
 Arne Lindblad as Man by the Car Accident 
 John Westin as 	Doctor 
 Stina Sorbon as Sture's Secretary

References

Bibliography 
 Qvist, Per Olov & von Bagh, Peter. Guide to the Cinema of Sweden and Finland. Greenwood Publishing Group, 2000.

External links 
 

1939 films
Swedish drama films
1939 drama films
1930s Swedish-language films
Films directed by Schamyl Bauman
1930s Swedish films